Koehler Instrument, or Koehler, is a US based company that provides petroleum, petrochemical testing equipment, and technical support services to testing laboratories worldwide. The company’s corporate headquarters is in Holtsville, NY and manufacturing headquarters is located in Bohemia, NY.

Koehler Instrument Company offers a full line of instruments for testing biofuels, fuels, lubes, and greases, as well as an extensive selection of tribology, or wear testing instruments. All Koehler products conform to the latest ASTM, ISO, IP and related international specifications.

Industry involvement

Koehler Instrument Company has been an active member of the American Society for Testing Materials, or ASTM, since 1947. 
Other organizations that Koehler holds membership with include the Society of Tribologists and Lubrication Engineers  and the American Institute of Chemical Engineers. Koehler is also an active member of the National Association of Lubricating Grease Manufacturers, Inc. (NLGI), with a representative on the Board of Directors.

Each year, Koehler Instrument Company attends conferences and expositions related to the petroleum testing industry. Some of the conferences that Koehler has exhibited at during recent years include the Pittsburgh Conference and Exposition, National Biodiesel Conference and Expo, and the Gulf Coast Conference.  Koehler also attends the STLE annual meeting  and the European Lubricating Grease Institute (ELGI) meeting each year.

Testing laboratory

Koehler's petroleum-testing laboratory provides in-house testing services for the analysis of petroleum products, lubricants, petrochemicals, asphalts, composites and other related products.  The laboratory is also involved with research and development of test equipment. Some of the specific ASTM tests run at the Koehler laboratory include oxidation stability, flash point, distillation, and viscosity.

Products

Koehler Instrument Company manufactures over 150 different types of instruments, all of which conform to ASTM, IP, ISO or other international standards.  Some of Koehler's major product lines are viscosity, flash point, tribology, penetration, distillation and biofuels test equipment.
Other products include colorimeters, centrifuges, oxidation stability units, automatic titration units, and cloud point and pour point testers. Koehler offers full lines of instruments for testing biofuels, fuels, lubes and greases.

References

Manufacturing companies based in New York (state)